The CIS men's national under 20 ice hockey team was an under-20 ice hockey team that played for one year at the International Ice Hockey Federation's World Junior Ice Hockey Championships in 1992. They represented the Commonwealth of Independent States - former Soviet Union nations, while the dissolution was occurring. They won the gold medal at the tournament. They were coached by Viktor Tikhonov.

Sporting the Soviet red jerseys, but with no name or logo, after each victory, there was no national anthem (as it was yet to select it for independent states), only the Olympic hymn.

The following year the team was dissolved.

References

Junior national ice hockey teams
Former national ice hockey teams